The red pigfish (Bodianus unimaculatus), also known as the red hogfish or eastern pigfish, is a species of wrasse native to the southwestern Pacific Ocean from eastern Australia to New Zealand, including Lord Howe Island, Norfolk Island, and the Kermadec Islands.

References

Red pigfish
Taxa named by Albert Günther
Fish described in 1862